Charles Brenner (18 November 1913, in Boston – 19 May 2008) was an American psychoanalyst who served as president of the New York Psychoanalytic Society, and is perhaps best known for his contributions to drive theory, the structure of the mind, and conflict theory.

He was for half a century an exemplary figure for psychoanalysis in America, being termed by Janet Malcolm “the intransigent purist of American psychoanalysis”.

Early contributions

Brenner first made his name as the author of the Elementary Textbook of Psychoanalysis, which Eric Berne paired with Freud's  Outline of Psychoanalysis as the best guide to the subject. In it he stressed for example how, unlike 'conscience',  the superego functions mainly or entirely unconsciously.

He went on to co-author, with Jacob Arlow, Psychoanalytic Concepts and the Structural Theory, which, initially controversial, would become a standard advanced text. Brenner himself conceded that probably “my most significant influence was as author of An Elementary Textbook”.

Technique

While Brenner favored a cool, aseptic analytic technique, and opposed the idea that the transference could be separated off from the so-called working alliance, he also challenged the mechanical use of the analysis of defences without consideration of the instinctual impulses involved.

Brenner pointed out that just as “it is presumptuous to act the analyst, unbidden, in a social or family situation. It is a technical lapse to be other than an analyst in one's relations with an analytic patient”. His technique epitomised what Malcolm called “taking respect for individual experience and generosity of spirit toward human frailty very far indeed'”.

Late revisions

Brenner has been notable for his readiness to challenge psychoanalytic dogmas, - something perhaps most apparent with his late revision of Freud's structural theory, culminating in his article "Conflict, Compromise Formation, and Structural Theory"(2002) which he himself considered “the most useful and valuable contribution I have been able to make to the field of psychoanalysis”.

His late development of conflict theory went back to Freud's early concept of 'compromise formation', as well as drawing on Arlow's idea of 'fantasy function' in a mixture of conservatism and innovation. Arguably the result was to produce the leading analytic theory for 21stC American psychoanalytic training.

Criticism

Brenner has been criticised for a tendency to follow his own theoretical furrow, rather than engage with other points of view.

See also

References

Further reading
 Charles Brenner, "Modern Conflict Theory"
 Charles Brenner, The Mind in Conflict (New York 1982)

2008 deaths
1913 births
American psychoanalysts
Jewish psychoanalysts